This is a list of members of the Australian House of Representatives from 2004 to 2007, as elected at the 2004 federal election, together known as the 41st Parliament. It had a total of 150 members, comprising 74 , 1 Country Liberal and 12  members, together forming a Coalition majority government with 87 members.  had 60 members and there were 3 independents.

 The Labor member for Werriwa, former opposition leader Mark Latham, resigned on 18 January 2005 citing health concerns. The Labor candidate Chris Hayes won the resulting by-election on 19 March.
 Franklin MP Harry Quick was expelled from the Labor Party on 20 August 2007 for failing to pay dues to the party. He served out the remainder of his term as an independent.

References

Members of Australian parliaments by term
21st-century Australian politicians